Pine City may refer to various communities in the United States:

 Pine City, California, a former mining camp
 Pine City, Minnesota
 Pine City Township, Pine County, Minnesota
 Pine City, New York
 Pine City, Oregon
 Pine City, Washington